All of a Sudden Peggy is a lost 1920 American silent comedy romance film directed by Walter Edwards and starring Marguerite Clark and Jack Mulhall. It was produced by Famous Players-Lasky and distributed by Paramount Pictures. It is based on a 1907 Broadway play All-of-a-Sudden-Peggy which starred the much older Henrietta Crosman. It is Clark's third to last film. Director Edwards died in Hawaii that same year of 1920.

Plot
As described in a film magazine, Peggy O'Hara (Clark) who with her widowed mother Mrs. O'Hara (Leighton) is staying at the manor of Lord Anthony Crackenthorpe (Humphrey), a scientist engrossed in the study of spiders. Mrs. O'Hara is assisting Lord Anthony. The sister of the peer sends for her son Jimmy (Mulhall) because she thinks Peggy has designs on Lord Anthony. Jimmy falls in love with Peggy, and in order to further her mother's love affair with Lord Anthony, Peggy announces her engagement with Jimmy. She goes to London where her pocket is picked, and has to stay at Jimmy's bachelor quarters while he is away on business. The sudden appearance of Jimmy, his mother and father, and a prying neighbor precipitates matters, with Peggy having spent the night there suggesting a scandal. In the end it is straightened out and Peggy consents to marry Jimmy.

Cast
Marguerite Clark as Peggy O'Hara
Jack Mulhall as Honorable Jimmy Keppel
Lillian Leighton as Mrs. O'Hara
Maggie Fisher as Lady Crackenthorpe
Orral Humphrey as Anthony, Lord Crackenthorpe
Sylvia Jocelyn as Millicent Keppel
A. Edward Sutherland as Jack Menzies
Tom Ricketts as Major Archie Phipps
Virginia Foltz as Mrs. Colquhoun

References

External links

allmovie/synopsis; All of a Sudden Peggy
Marguerite Clark and Jack Mulhall filming a scene
Still of Clark and Mulhall in a scene (University of Washington, Sayre collection)

1920 films
American silent feature films
American films based on plays
Paramount Pictures films
Lost American films
1920 romantic comedy films
American romantic comedy films
Films directed by Walter Edwards
American black-and-white films
1920 lost films
Lost romantic comedy films
1920s American films
Silent romantic comedy films
Silent American comedy films
1920s English-language films